Sarkan is a city in Hamadan Province, Iran.

Sarkan may also refer to:
 Sarkan, Ilam (سركان - Sarkān)
 Sarkan, Kermanshah (سركن - Sarkan)
 Sarkan-e Olya Khuzestan Province
 Sarkan-e Sofla Khuzestan Province

See also
 Sarkun (disambiguation)